Ugandan People's Defence Force Air Force, more commonly known as Ugandan Air Force, is the branch of the Uganda People's Defence Force that deals with the air warfare. It headquarters is located at Entebbe, Uganda. The current air force commander is Charles Lutaaya, while Emmanuel Kwihangana serves as chief of air staff.

History

Uganda Army Air Force 
The Ugandan Air Force traces its history to 1964, when the country's first air force was established with Israeli aid. This military branch was officially called "Uganda Army Air Force" (UAAF). Its first aircraft was of Israeli origin, and its initial pilots trained in Israel. As Uganda's government forged closer links with the Eastern Bloc, the UAAF began to acquire more aircraft as well as support in training from the Soviet Union, Czechoslovakia, and Libya. Israeli aid initially continued as well. After Idi Amin seized power during the 1971 Ugandan coup d'état, the Uganda Army, including its air force, were further expanded. At the same time, corruption and infighting increased, while foreign aid began to decline, reducing the UAAF's ability to operate.

Much of the UAAF was destroyed in Operation Entebbe in 1976, although it was subsequently rebuilt with mainly Libyan and Soviet support.

By late 1978, the UAAF was commanded by Lieutenant Colonel Christopher Gore and consisted of several dozen MiG-21MFs, MiG-21UMs, MiG-17s, and MiG-15UTIs. Some of the available aircraft were not combat-ready, however, and were abandoned during the Uganda–Tanzania War without seeing action. The lack of spare parts especially affected the Mig-15s and MiG-17s. The UAAF was split into three fighter squadrons. However the force was effectively wiped out during the 1978/1979 air campaign of the Uganda–Tanzania War. Its pilots and technicians scattered, many fleeing abroad; its aircraft were lost or taken by the Tanzanians.

Air forces from 1979 
After Idi Amin’s overthrow and the UAAF's destruction during the Uganda-Tanzania War, there were repeated attempts by the next Ugandan governments to organize a new air force. The new national military, generally known as Uganda National Liberation Army (UNLA), acquired a few helicopters and organized a small air wing. A further restoration remained impossible due to lack of funding as well as renewed internal conflict, as the country plunged into a civil war known as Ugandan Bush War.

The Bush War was won by the rebel National Resistance Movement (NRM) in 1986, resulting in the organization of yet another national military. The NRM government began rebuilding the air force, but the "Ugandan People's Defence Air Force" remained extremely small until the 1990s, counting just 100 personnel by 1994.

Modern air force 
The modern air force, in its current form, was established in 2005 by the Defence forces Act, section (3) sub- section (2) with mission of the country's comprehensive Defence policy mainly in the threat analysis despite being a landlocked country. It was formed as a statutory institute and service in the arms of the Uganda Defence Forces.

In 2011, Emmanuel Tumusiime-Mutebile, the central bank governor, caused large volatility in the Ugandan shilling when he told the Financial Times that President Museveni had ignored technical advice against using Uganda's small foreign exchange reserves to buy new Sukhoi Su-30 fighter aircraft.

In June 2022, Uganda took delivery of at least three Mi-28N Havoc attack helicopters from Russia.

Mission of the UPDF Air Force 

The UPDF Air Force's mission is to defend the country's air space, and provide support to the army's operations. Other missions include:
 Participation in regional peace missions
 Provision of support to the army
 Building of a standard well-trained officer and enlisted corps capable of adequately contributing to the fulfillment of the Uganda Air Force's mission
 To remain Uganda's strategic defence power by deterring potential threats and establishing superiority in combat

Base and training facilities 
The Ugandan Air Force has their training facilities located at Gulu Air Base including the equipment and additional trainer aircraft all located at Gulu, it also has it training center located there established since 2011, a five-year training programs. The Gulu airport is controlled by the Air wing of the Uganda People Defence Forces. The Gulu airport is at Gulu District.

Air base upgrading 
As of 14 November 2019, the President of Uganda has set up a committee to upgrade the Gulu Airport to international standards; the construction will determine the features and installations of the aircraft hangars, access routes, vehicles water treatment systems, ground markings, parking areas for both aircraft and control towers, according to the President.

As of 28 March to 31 March 2020, six training combat aircraft were upgraded by the Ukraine's state owned defence conglomerate UkrOboronProm (UOP) sending a team of 14 pilots, designer and engineer from the Odessa Aviation Plant for the operations including some available repairs. The operations was carried out in Gulu Air Base after an agreement since 2018, some of the jet amongst are Ugandan Aero L-39 Albatros; a training and light attack jet, Ugandan L-39ZA which 8 of them were overhauled, and modernized and the AI-25TL turbofan was all overhauled and upgraded into AI-25TLSh with a standard of 10% trust, improved control and modernized radio including navigation.

During the passing out ceremony of the 2020 graduation set in Gulu airport, the President of Uganda had promised to start the construction of 30,000 housing units countrywide to solve the UPDF housing shortage in the country.

Service contract
In March 2022, the UPDF Air Force signed a memorandum of understanding (MOU) with Government of India, for the  latter to maintain and service Uganda's Russian-made multirole Su-30MK2 fighter jets. The work will be carried out by Hindustan Aeronautics Limited (HAL), based in Bengaluru, India. HAL is fully owned by the Indian government. The agreement was signed at the Embassy of India to Uganda, in Uganda's capital city, Kampala.

Other affiliation 
The UPDAF commended the Lord's Resistance Army Disarmament and Northern Uganda Recovery Act signed by President Barack Obama, leading to cooperation between the Ugandan People Defence Force, Ugandan People's Defence Air Force, and Air Forces Africa for establishing good partnerships and military engagement. In 2018 the UPDAF promoted 107 soldiers to commissioned and higher ranks.

Air force commanders

Uganda Army Air Force 
 Wilson Toko (died 1973)
 Smuts Guweddeko (1973–1974)
 Zeddy Maruru (1974–1975)
 Idi Amin (1975 – ?)
 Godwin Sule (acting,  1976)
 Christopher Gore (1978 – 1979)
 Andrew Mukooza (1979)

UNLA air wing 
 Peter Oringi (1982 – ?)

UPDF Air Force 
 Samuel Turyagyenda (2013 – 2017)
 Charles Lutaaya (2017 – present)

Inventory

Current inventory

References

Citations

Works cited 

 
 
 
 
 

2005 establishments in Uganda
Defence agencies of Uganda
Military units and formations established in 1964
Uganda People's Defence Force
Military of Uganda
Military aviation in Africa